Overhead information is digital information transferred across the functional interface between a user and a telecommunications system, or between functional units within a telecommunications system, for the purpose of directing or controlling the transfer of user information or the detection and correction of errors.  

Overhead information originated by the user is not considered to be system overhead information. Overhead information generated within the communications system and not delivered to the user is system overhead information. Thus, the user throughput is reduced by both overheads while system throughput is reduced only by system overhead.

References

Data transmission